Ashok Namdeorao Mohol  is an Indian politician. He was elected to the Lok Sabha, the lower house of the Parliament of India.

References

External links
Official biographical sketch in Parliament of India website

India MPs 1998–1999
India MPs 1999–2004
Lok Sabha members from Maharashtra
1941 births
Living people
Nationalist Congress Party politicians from Maharashtra
Indian National Congress politicians